Petronella "Petsy" Aspasia Wyatt (born 6 May 1968) is a British journalist and author.

Early life and education
Wyatt was born on 6 May 1968 at 12 Devonshire Street, West London, England. Her parents were journalist and former Labour politician Woodrow Wyatt and his fourth wife, Hungarian-born Veronica "Verushka" Banszky von Ambroz (née Racz).  

Wyatt attended St Paul's Girls' School. She then began reading history at Worcester College, Oxford. Wyatt left the university within weeks of her first term, after, she says, suffering persistent bullying and harassment due to her father's position as friend of and political advisor to Margaret Thatcher. She subsequently read history at University College London.

Career
After graduating, Wyatt became a trainee journalist and later weekly columnist for the Sunday Telegraph in the early 1990s. She then worked for magazine The Spectator, where she was promoted to deputy editor.

In 1996, when interviewing the proposed Labour Minister for Women Janet Anderson, Anderson joked that "under Labour, women will become more promiscuous", which Wyatt reported as policy. Denis Healey regretted at the close of an interview with Wyatt that there was no time left for "rumpy pumpy".

Personal life 
Between 2000 and 2004, Wyatt had an affair with the then editor of The Spectator and Conservative MP Boris Johnson. Johnson had promised to leave his wife, and the affair had resulted in a terminated pregnancy and a miscarriage. When her mother found out about the affair, she discussed it with the press. Johnson was fired from his shadow cabinet post by party leader Michael Howard for lying about the affair, after he had initially categorically denied it.

Publications
Father, dear Father: Life with Woodrow Wyatt, Hutchinson, London, 1999. 
Secrets of The Press, edited by Stephen Glover.
The Third Plantagenet: George Duke of Clarence, John Ashdown Hill. The History Press, 2014. Contribution.

References

1968 births
Living people
People from Westminster
People educated at St Paul's Girls' School
Alumni of University College London
English people of Hungarian descent
People from St John's Wood
Daughters of life peers
English journalists
English women journalists
English biographers
English women non-fiction writers
English columnists
British women columnists
British women biographers